High School Musical is a 2006 American musical television film directed by Kenny Ortega and written by Peter Barsocchini. The 63rd Disney Channel Original Movie (DCOM) and first installment of the High School Musical film series, the film stars Zac Efron, Vanessa Hudgens, Ashley Tisdale, Lucas Grabeel, Alyson Reed, Corbin Bleu, and Monique Coleman. In High School Musical, Troy Bolton (Efron), the basketball team captain, and Gabriella Montez (Hudgens), an academically-gifted transfer student, try out for the lead parts in their school musical, causing division among the school's cliques.

Development for the film began after Disney network executives wanted to replicate the critical and viewership success of standalone musical episodes in their television series Even Stevens (2000–2003) and That's So Raven (2003–2007). Principal photography for High School Musical primarily took place in Utah, with filming locations including East High School, Murray High School, and Salt Lake City. Additional filming took place in Los Angeles. The film has been described by Barsocchini and numerous critics as a modern adaptation of Romeo & Juliet.

Upon its release on January 20, 2006, as part of Disney Channel’s "Gotta Sing, Gotta Dance Week" block, it became the most commercially successful DCOM ever produced. In the U.S., High School Musical generated 7.7 million viewers in its premiere broadcast, breaking the then-record for the highest premiere for the network. Internationally, the film also saw considerable success; as of 2019, over 225 million unique viewers were calculated as watched High School Musical. The film received generally mixed reviews from critics, with praise for its cast and music but criticism for its sentimentality; it was more positively received by audiences. The film's soundtrack was commercially and critically successful, reaching atop the U.S. Billboard 200, with its lead single, "Breaking Free", reaching number four on the U.S. Billboard Hot 100. Two sequels, High School Musical 2 and High School Musical 3: Senior Year, were released in August 2007 and October 2008 respectively.

Plot
On New Year's Eve, high school juniors Troy Bolton and Gabriella Montez meet at a ski lodge party during winter break. The two are called upon to sing a duet together for karaoke ("Start of Something New"). Returning to school after the break, Troy sees Gabriella in his homeroom. She explains that she has just moved to Albuquerque, New Mexico, and transferred to East High School over the break. As Troy shows Gabriella around the school, drama club president Sharpay Evans assumes that Gabriella is interested in auditioning for the school musical. Wanting to eliminate the competition, Sharpay discovers Gabriella's past academic achievements, and anonymously informs scholastic decathlon captain Taylor McKessie of them, so she will recruit Gabriella for the team. Taylor and Gabriella become friends over their shared interests.

During a basketball practice, Troy is distracted by thoughts of Gabriella and the idea that he might enjoy singing in addition to basketball ("Get'cha Head in the Game"). Gabriella and Troy go to the musical auditions where Sharpay and her twin brother Ryan Evans perform "What I've Been Looking For". However, Troy and Gabriella are hesitant to audition. When Gabriella gains the confidence to step forward once the auditions are unofficially declared "over", Troy offers to sing with her. However, drama teacher Ms. Darbus tells them they are too late and leaves. Kelsi Nielsen, the musical's composer, drops her music sheets on the stage; Troy and Gabriella rush to help her and sing the same song together. Overhearing their performance, Ms. Darbus gives them a callback audition.

When the callback list gets posted, Sharpay is furious that she has competition for the lead role, while the Wildcats basketball team is shocked that Troy has auditioned. After finding out that Troy can do activities outside his clique, other students confess their secret passions and talents ("Stick to the Status Quo"). This alarms Taylor and Troy's best friend Chad Danforth. Taylor and Chad come up with a plan to divert Troy and Gabriella from singing in the musical so they can focus on their upcoming competitions.

In the locker room, Troy is tricked by his teammates into saying that Gabriella and the audition are not important to him. Gabriella watches this via a hidden webcam that the scholastic decathlon team has set up. Upset by Troy's perceived betrayal and callous disregard for her ("When There Was Me and You"), Gabriella decides to not audition for the musical, and distances herself from Troy. Troy, confused by Gabriella's behavior, is unable to concentrate on the game, while Gabriella is low in spirits. Realizing their mistake, Chad and the basketball team tell Troy what happened and offer to support him in the callbacks. Taylor also explains to Gabriella that she was wrong but Gabriella dismisses this, believing Troy meant what he said. That evening, Troy goes to Gabriella's house where he explains the truth and they reconcile, determined to audition for the musical.

Overhearing Gabriella and Troy rehearse, Sharpay asks Ms. Darbus to move the callbacks so they start at the same time as both Troy's championship game and Gabriella's scholastic decathlon competition. Kelsi overhears the conversation, and both the basketball and decathlon teams make a plan together. On the day of the competitions, Taylor and Gabriella use the school's computers to delay the championship game by hacking the power in the gym and causing a chemical reaction that forces an evacuation during the decathlon. Troy and Gabriella rush to the auditorium as Sharpay and Ryan finish their callback song ("Bop to the Top"). After Gabriella and Troy successfully perform their song "Breaking Free", Ms. Darbus gives them the lead roles, making Sharpay and Ryan understudies. Both teams win their respective competitions, and the entire school gathers in the gym to celebrate ("We're All in This Together"). Chad asks Taylor out, and Sharpay makes a truce with Gabriella.

In a post-credits scene, Zeke Baylor paces alone in the gym, when Sharpay runs in, declaring that the cookies he had given her that she had initially rejected are "genius". She hugs him, and he says he will make her a crème brûlée. Zeke smiles in victory.

Cast

 Zac Efron as Troy Bolton, one of the most popular students at East High School and the captain of the varsity basketball team. Before Efron was cast, the role of Troy was written for a tenor, and Efron, who himself is a baritone, could not properly sing most of the parts. Singer-songwriter and actor Drew Seeley, who also auditioned for the role, provided majority of the character's singing voice, with Efron himself singing the first few lines in "Start of Something New" and "Breaking Free".
 Vanessa Hudgens as Gabriella Montez, a transfer student who joins the scholastic decathlon team and is attracted to Troy.
 Ashley Tisdale as Sharpay Evans, an energetic and proud student with a love of theatre and being the center of attention—particularly Troy's who employs her twin brother, Ryan, in her schemes.
 Lucas Grabeel as Ryan Evans, a member of the drama club who aids his twin sister, Sharpay, in sabotaging Gabriella's relationship with Troy.
 Alyson Reed as Ms. Darbus, the stern drama teacher at East High who dislikes Mr. Bolton, sports, and cell phones.
 Corbin Bleu as Chad Danforth, Troy's best friend and member of the basketball team.
 Monique Coleman as Taylor McKessie, captain of the school's scholastic decathlon team who shows Gabriella the ropes of East High.
 Bart Johnson as Jack Bolton, Troy's father and the coach of the East High basketball team who believes that Gabriella is a distraction from Troy's basketball career.
 Olesya Rulin as Kelsi Nielsen, an underappreciated pianist and composer who is initially shy and subservient to Sharpay.
 Chris Warren Jr. as Zeke Baylor, a member of the basketball team who enjoys baking and admires Sharpay.
 Ryne Sanborn as Jason Cross, a member of the basketball team who tends to ask mundane questions in class. 
 Socorro Herrera as Lisa Montez, Gabriella's mother, whose job makes them subject to frequent relocation.
 Joey Miyashima as Dave Matsui, the principal of East High.
 Irene Santiago-Baron as Ms. Tenny, a chemistry teacher at East High.
 Leslie Wing Pomeroy as Lucille Bolton, Troy's mother.
 Joyce Cohen as Ms. Falstaff, the librarian at East High.
 Kaycee Stroh as Martha Cox, a peppy brainiac who enjoys hip-hop.
 Anne Kathryn Parma as Susan, a student who unsuccessfully auditions for the winter musical.
 Nick Whitaker as Alan, a student who unsuccessfully auditions for the winter musical.
 Falcon Grace as Cyndra, a student who unsuccessfully auditions for the winter musical.

Music

The soundtrack for the film was released on January 10, 2006, and debuted at number 133 on the Billboard 200, selling 7,469 copies in its first week. In the album's third week, for the chart dated February 11, 2006, it climbed to number ten, subsequently rose to number one on the Billboard 200 twice (on March 1 and 22) and had shipped 3.8 million copies as of December 5, 2006. Out of those copies, more than three million copies had been sold by August 2006; it was certified quadruple platinum by the RIAA.

Production
Disney Channel produced a musical episode of its original sitcom Even Stevens, which aired in 2002, and the success of the episode among the show's audience led to network executives asking series executive producers David Brookwell and Sean McNamara to also produce a musical episode of their other comedy series That's So Raven. The success of the musical format on both Even Stevens and That's So Raven gave executives confidence in the appeal and interest of the musical genre, and led to the early development of the idea for High School Musical. Gary Marsh, then-president of Disney Channels Worldwide, stated that High School Musical would not have been developed if not for the success of the Even Stevens musical episode.

Principal photography for High School Musical took place in Utah, with East High School and Murray High School used as locations, as well as Salt Lake City. Additional scenes were filmed in Los Angeles.

Reception
Upon its premiere, the film attracted 7.7 million viewers. On Rotten Tomatoes, the film holds an approval rating of 65% based on 20 reviews, with an average rating of 5.7/10. The website's critics consensus reads: "High School Musical is brazenly saccharine, but it makes up for it with its memorable show tunes, eye-popping choreography, and appealing cast."

Common Sense Media rated the film four out of five stars. Kevin Carr gave the film a score of three out of five, saying, "The filmmakers were just trying to tell a story. Sex, drugs and violence just didn't factor into that equation." On the other hand, David Nusair gave the film a negative review with a score of 1.5/4 saying, "...it's difficult to imagine even the most die-hard fan of musicals finding anything here worth embracing." Scott Weinberg also gave the film a negative review saying, "A schmaltzy little piece of obvious fluff that's directed in truly horrendous fashion and populated by cardboard characters who spit out simplistic platitudes and breathy pop tunes."

Home media
The DVD went on sale on May 23, 2006, under the title, High School Musical: Encore Edition. It created a sales record when 1.2 million copies were sold in its first six days, making it the fastest-selling television film of all time. It is, however, the second DCOM (Disney Channel Original Movie) on DVD to be certified Platinum in DVD sales, the first being The Cheetah Girls. The High School Musical DVD was also released in Australia on July 12, 2006, through Walt Disney, as well as on European Region 2 on December 4, 2006, where it went on to reach number one in the UK DVD charts. It also aired on Disney Channel South Africa, the latest Disney channel at that time in the southern hemisphere. It was the top-selling DVD in Australia in August 2006. High School Musical also became the first Disney Channel Original Movie to be released on Region 3 DVD, when it went on sale on October 10 and December 15 in Hong Kong and Taiwan, respectively. It was released in Mexico on November 10 and in Brazil on December 6 to coincide with Christmas and the Rede Globo broadcast of the film. It was released in New Zealand on July 12, 2006, and was awarded most popular pre-teen movie in New Zealand for 2006.

High School Musical was the first feature-length video content from the iTunes Store in mid-March 2006. At the time, it was available as a 320x240 resolution 487MB download for $9.99 after initially being mistakenly listed for $1.99.

The Remix Edition, a 2-disc Special Edition, was released on December 5, 2006. The Remix DVD went on sale in France on June 20, 2007. in Germany on September 13, 2007, and in the UK on September 10, 2007.

Despite being filmed in the 16:9 (1.78:1) aspect ratio, both the original and Remix Edition DVD releases featured a 4:3 (1.33:1) "full screen" version (though not pan and scan as the camera stays directly in the center of the image), the format of the film as shown on the Disney Channel. The widescreen, high definition version is available exclusively on Disney Blu-ray in North America and has subsequently been showing in the UK and Ireland on BBC One and BBC HD, and RTÉ One. The HD version is also available on the video section of PlayStation Store, as well as on Sony Entertainment online for the US market.

Expanded franchise

Sequels and spin-off

A sequel, High School Musical 2, premiered on August 17, 2007, on Disney Channel in the U.S., and on Family in Canada. The premiere brought in a total of 17.3 million viewers in the United States—almost 10 million more than its predecessor—making it (at the time of its airing) the highest-rated Disney Channel Original Movie to date and the most viewed television film to date. 

A third film, High School Musical 3: Senior Year, was theatrically released in the United States on October 24, 2008. Kenny Ortega returned as director and choreographer, as did all six main actors. 

Sharpay's Fabulous Adventure is a spin-off and direct-to-DVD film starring Ashley Tisdale. The film follows Sharpay Evans as she sets out to earn a role in a Broadway show following graduation. The film was released as a Blu-ray and DVD combination pack on April 19, 2011. 

In early 2016, Disney announced that a fourth installment of the series was "in the works", later announcing a casting call for the film, tentatively referred to as High School Musical 4. In March 2016, details about the film's prospective principal characters were reported.

Television adaptation 

In 2019, Disney announced the release of their own television series based on the High School Musical franchise that was released on Disney+ on November 12, 2019. The series, titled High School Musical: The Musical: The Series, focuses on the newly enrolled set of East High Wildcats putting together a production of High School Musical.

Foreign adaptations

High School Musical: El desafio (Argentina) is a spin-off for the Argentine market, based on the book "Battle of the Bands". The film arrived in Argentine theatres on July 17, 2008. High School Musical: O Desafio is a spin-off of the American film High School Musical. The Brazilian spin-off is based on the book Battle of the Bands. The film was released in Brazilian theatres on February 5, 2010. Disney High School Musical China, also called High School Musical China: College Dreams is a Chinese version of the American series, released in North America on DVD under the Disney World Cinema Brand. 

Film Business Asia critic Derek Elley rated the adaptation three points out of ten and called the choreography by former Madonna dancer, Ruthy Inchaustegui, and songs "bland".

Stage adaptations

On August 1, 2006, Playbill announced that the Stagedoor Manor summer theater camp, featured in the film Camp, would be the first venue to produce High School Musical on-stage. The High School Musical: The Concert tour started on November 29, 2006, kicking off in San Diego, California. The tour continued until January 28, 2007, performing in major cities around the United States, Canada, and Latin America. The concert featured all of the original cast members except for Zac Efron, who was shooting Hairspray. Efron was replaced by Drew Seeley (whose voice was blended with Efron's during the film). The concert featured the original songs from the film, as well as songs from Vanessa Hudgens, Ashley Tisdale, and Corbin Bleu. 

"Feld Entertainment" produced global tour titled, High School Musical: The Ice Tour which had its world premiere in New York City on September 29, 2007. The cast included 2004 World Junior Bronze Medalist Jordan Brauninger and 2004–2005 Australian national champion Bradley Santer. The show contained elements and songs from both the original film and its sequel, High School Musical 2 and featured a special preview of High School Musical 3: Senior Year when the movie of the same name premiered in theatres.

Merchandise

In June 2006, Disney Press published High School Musical: The Junior Novel, the novelization of the successful film. This novel hit number one on the New York Times best-selling list and remained on the list for sixteen weeks. As of August 2007, the novel has sold more than 4.5 million copies, with 1 million copies of the novel's follow-up, High School Musical 2: The Junior Novel, being shipped to American retailers. High School Musical 3: Senior Year: The Junior Novel was released on September 23, 2008. 

Shortly after the success of the original novel, Disney announced that a book series, entitled Stories from East High, would be published in February 2007 with a new book being published every 60 days until July 2008. Disney Interactive Studios has produced 6 video games (High School Musical: Sing It!, High School Musical: Makin' the Cut!, High School Musical 2: Work This Out DS, High School Musical 3: Senior Year DANCE!, High School Musical 3: Senior Year DS and Disney Sing It! - High School Musical 3: Senior Year) based on the High School Musical series, all taking the guise of music video games incorporating songs and plots from the films.

Awards

References

External links

 
 High School Musical DVDs – Disney's Official High School Musical DVD site
 
 
 High School Musical Song Lyrics

2006 romantic comedy films
2006 television films
2006 films
2000s fads and trends
2000s high school films
2000s musical comedy films
2000s romantic musical films
2000s teen comedy films
2000s teen romance films
American basketball films
American high school films
American musical comedy films
American romantic comedy films
American romantic musical films
American teen comedy films
American teen musical films
American teen romance films
American comedy television films
Emmy Award-winning programs
Films about music and musicians
Films adapted into plays
Films directed by Kenny Ortega
Films set in New Mexico
Films shot in Salt Lake City
High School Musical films
Romance television films
2000s English-language films
2000s American films